Dawkinsia rubrotinctus is a species of barb native to the Kaveri river basin in southern India.

References

Dawkinsia
Freshwater fish of India
Endemic fauna of India
Taxa named by Thomas C. Jerdon
Fish described in 1849